Billy Hill may refer to:

 Billy Hill (band), an American country music group active from 1989 to 1990
 Billy Hill (gangster) (1911–1984), British gangster and criminal mastermind
 Billy Hill (songwriter) (1899–1940), American songwriter and lyricist
 Billy Hill (footballer) (born 1936), English footballer
 Billy Hill and the Hillbillies, a musical/variety group at Disneyland in Anaheim, California between 1992 and 2014

See also 
 Billy Hillenbrand (1922–1994), American football halfback
 William Hill (disambiguation)
 Hill (surname)
 

Hill, Billy